Muhammad Iqbal Assegaf (October 12, 1957 – February 13, 1999) was an Indonesian political activist. Based on the results of the 9th Indonesian Islamic Student Movement congress (PMII IX congress) in Hajj Dormitory Surabaya, East Java, Iqbal was appointed as chairman of the Executive Board of the Indonesian Islamic Student Movement (PB PMII) period 1988–1991 replacing Suryadharma Ali. After leaving the position as Chairman of PB PMII, he was immediately appointed as Chairman of the Board of Trustees PB PMII in the next period, 1991–1994.

Iqbal died on February 13, 1999, due to a car accident at the exit of the Cawang–Tanjung Priok Toll Road. At that time Iqbal drove a dark blue BMW B 63 RI with his wife, Rahma. Iqbal held the last post as Chairman of the Central Executive Board of the Ansor Youth Movement period 1995-2000. In addition, he also served as a member of the People's Representative Council of Indonesia period 1998-2003 from the Golkar Party. The two positions were never held at the end because Iqbal died first in 1999.

References

Footnotes

Works cited

Bibliography

 
 
 
 

1957 births
1999 deaths
Indonesian people of Yemeni descent
Indonesian activists
People from North Maluku
Bogor Agricultural University alumni
Golkar politicians
Nahdlatul Ulama
Road incident deaths in Indonesia